Mark Fischer may refer to:

 Mark Fischer (American football) (born 1974), former American football player
 Mark Fischer (attorney) (1950–2015), co-author of BioBricks agreement and copyright attorney

See also
 Mark Fisher (disambiguation)